The Ocean Beach Railway (OBR) is a heritage railway that operates in Dunedin, New Zealand.  It is located between John Wilson Drive in the suburb of Saint Kilda and sports grounds near Forbury Park Raceway, and runs parallel with the city's main beach, Ocean Beach. This is near where the Ocean Beach Branch once ran, but not on the same formation.

The OBR can claim a couple notable distinctions.  The first is that it was the first organisation to preserve a steam locomotive in New Zealand with the intention of operating it. The second is that it was the first operating heritage railway in New Zealand, with the first train running in 1963.

History
In 1960, the late S. A. Rockliff and a small group of members of the New Zealand Railway and Locomotive Society Otago Branch placed a bid of $20 to purchase a small 9-ton Fowler 0-4-0T tank locomotive, Maker's NO 15912 of 1921 and used by the Public Works Department as their NO 540, from the Otago Harbour Board. Their bid was successful, making this locomotive the first to be preserved by a heritage railway in New Zealand. The locomotive whistle was first heard near the site of the former Ocean Beach railway station in August 1961.

Permission was granted by the Ocean Beach Domain Board to lay some 60yds of track at Kettle Park in Saint Kilda, alongside the Otago Model Engineers' Club grounds. Surplus tram rails were obtained from the Dunedin City Council. Passenger operations began during Festival Week in 1963 with PWD 540 and a four-wheeled wagon fitted with high sides, carrying some 2,700 passengers. It was decided to extend the line to the nearby locality of Saint Clair, following part of the route of the Dunedin Peninsula and Ocean Beach Railway.

During this period the OBR extended both their line and their collection with other locomotives donated by or purchased from Milburn Lime & Cement, the Otago Harbour Board, and McDonalds Lime among others. More rolling stock including examples of historic passenger carriages and goods wagons were purchased from the NZR, including the remains of two Dunedin & Port Chalmers Railway vehicles. A locomotive shed and later carriage shed were built, and protected by an eight-foot high, vandal-proof fence.

List of locomotives

Rolling stock 
The OBR possesses numerous historic passenger carriages, an assortment of freight wagons, and a hand crane. The collection includes the following vehicles:
 A 193 and A 210, two 43' 0" passenger carriages built at Addington Workshops in 1886 and 1883 respectively to BP 91. They are the most complete examples of their type in preservation. As of 2023, A 193 is in regular service and A 210 is partway through its restoration, however, the restoration is currently paused.
 A 529, a 41' 0" gallery or 'birdcage' coach built by Addington Workshops in 1897. It was converted into a Ministerial carriage in 1904, before being converted in 1939 to EA 1564, the South Island Plumbers and Fitters coach. The body is in storage at Ocean Beach while the underframe was sent to Pleasant Point in 1975 for their "half-birdcage" coach, A 421.
 A 1254, a 47’6” passenger car. It was leased to the Otago Excursion Train Trust ( OETT ) and has since been returned, and is now undergoing restoration for its debut in 2023.
 AF 874, a 47' 6" 'carvan' or combination passenger carriage and guards' van. Converted from 1904-built passenger carriage A 874 in 1948, this carriage was purchased by the Taieri Model Club in 1968 and was donated to the OBR in 1977. This carriage is currently in regular service.
 D 139, a 21' 6" four-wheeled passenger carriage built by the Dunedin firm of Hyslops in 1877. One of only three D class carriages preserved, its last use was as Way and Works hut E 897. It is currently in storage awaiting restoration.
 F 11, originally a 20' guards van built in 1886 by the Public Works Department (PWD) as the PWD 9288. It was built to BP 198. It was converted to a plough-van and purchased by the Ohai Railway Board. It is now owned by the Southland District Council, and is on lease to the National Railway Museum. It is currently in storage at the Ocean Beach Railway while the NRM raise the funds to move the van to Christchurch.
 F 2530, a steel-clad 40' Guardsvan that was donated to the OBR in 2021. Not currently onsite, but is mostly complete and the OBR has a set of bogies to complete it. Pre-TMS F 641.

Ocean Beach is well renowned for its active restoration of freight rolling stock, some examples of which are very rare and have earned the railway numerous restoration awards. The railway also owns 5-ton Ransome & Rapier hand crane 287 of 1874, and restoration work on the crane earned the OBR a Rolling Stock Award from the Federation of Rail Organisations NZ. The Ocean Beach Railway is one of very few railways in New Zealand which can produce an accurate late 19th century period train.

The OBR also owns the underframes of two ex-Dunedin & Port Chalmers Railway Company vehicles. It is thought they are possibly goods wagons although carriage historian John Agnew believes that they may be from passenger carriages.

Operation 
The Ocean Beach Railway has traditionally operated a summer schedule with services every Sunday.  In 2006, the OBR commenced operating a reduced winter schedule, featuring services on the last Sunday of every month. Trains are operated by a diesel locomotive. Currently, TR 81 is used to pull trains, with A67 and Kerr Stuart 4185 out of service for its 10-year boiler examination. DSA 252 is currently out of service, however, will be back in service in the near future.

References

External links
The Ocean Beach Railway's official website
Weka Pass Railway's page on A 67
 Location map
 A video of the operation
 Dunedin Railway Station - Rolling Stock Display Page 1

Rail transport in Dunedin
Heritage railways in New Zealand
Tourist attractions in Dunedin
Organisations based in Dunedin